Jan Francis van 't Hooft (born 3 January 1940) is a retired field hockey player from the Netherlands. He competed  at the 1964 Summer Olympics where his team finished in seventh place. He played six matches and scored two goals.

References

External links
 

1940 births
Living people
Dutch male field hockey players
Field hockey players at the 1964 Summer Olympics
Olympic field hockey players of the Netherlands
People from Semarang
20th-century Dutch people